Qaidi (also Romanized as Qāīdī, Qā‘edī, and Qāyedī) is a village in Jam Rural District, in the Central District of Jam County, Bushehr Province, Iran. At the 2006 census, its population was 604, in 128 families.

References 

Populated places in Jam County